Devario deruptotalea is a freshwater fish endemic to India.

References

Freshwater fish of India
Fish described in 2014
Devario